Part XXI of the Constitution of India is a compilation of laws pertaining to the constitution of India as a country and the union of states that it is made of.  This part of the constitution consists of Articles on Temporary, Transitional and Special Provisions.

Articles 370 – 371J
On Special provisions with respect to states
 Article 370 - provision with respect to the State of Jammu and Kashmir. It was abrogated in 2019.
 Article 371   - provision with respect to the States of Maharashtra(Vidarbha and Marathwada) and Gujarat(Saurashtra and Kutch).
 Article 371A - Special provision with respect to the State of Nagaland(Naga hills , Tuensang area). It was inserted into the Part XXI of the Indian Constitution in the year 1962.
 Article 371B - Special provision (administration) with respect to the State of Assam(Bodoland territorial area).
 Article 371C - Special provision(administration) with respect to the State of Manipur.
 Article 371 D - Special provisions with respect to the State of Andhra Pradesh. 
 Article 371E - Establishment of Central University in Andhra Pradesh.
 Article 371F Special provisions with respect to the State of Sikkim.
 Article 371G - Special provision with respect to the State of Mizoram.
 Article 371H  -Special provision(law and order) with respect to the State of Arunachal Pradesh.
 Article 371I  -Special provision with respect to the State of Goa(Portuguese culture). 
 Article 371J  - Special provision with respect to the State of Karnataka.

Articles 372 – 378A 
Provisions for Offices - President, Judges, etc . These were mostly introduced for continuation of "Rule of Law" from British Raj to Indian Govt.

Articles 379 – 391B
Repealed – Replaced by the Constitution (Seventh Amendment) Act, 1956

Articles 392 

 Article 392  -Power of the President to remove difficulties

References

Sources

Part XXI text from wikisource

Part 21